The 2014 Hockenheimring GP2 Series round was a GP2 Series motor race held on July 19 and 20, 2014 at Hockenheimring in Hockenheim, Germany. It was the fifth round of the 2014 GP2 Season. The race weekend supported the 2014 German Grand Prix.

Classification

Qualifying

Feature race

Sprint race

See also 
 2014 German Grand Prix
 2014 Hockenheimring GP3 Series round

External links
 

Hockenheim
GP2